Hamed Afagh Eslamieh (born February 1, 1983) is a professional Iranian basketball player who plays for Shahrdari Arak of the Iranian Super League and also for the Iranian national basketball team.

Honours

National team
Asian Championship
Gold medal: 2007, 2009, 2013
Asian Games
Bronze medal: 2006, 2010
Islamic Solidarity Games
Bronze medal: 2005
Asian Indoor Games
Gold medal: 2009

Club
Asian Championship
Gold medal: 2007, 2008 (Saba Battery), 2009, 2010 (Mahram)
West Asian Championship
Gold medal: 2007 (Saba Battery), 2010, 2012 (Mahram)
Iranian Super League
Champions: 2004, 2006, 2007 (Saba Battery), 2010, 2012 (Mahram), 2013 (Petrochimi)

External links
 
 

1983 births
Living people
Asian Games bronze medalists for Iran
Asian Games medalists in basketball
Asian Games silver medalists for Iran
Basketball players at the 2006 Asian Games
Basketball players at the 2008 Summer Olympics
Basketball players at the 2010 Asian Games
Basketball players at the 2014 Asian Games
Iranian men's basketball players
Mahram Tehran BC players
Medalists at the 2006 Asian Games
Medalists at the 2010 Asian Games
Medalists at the 2014 Asian Games
Olympic basketball players of Iran
Petrochimi Bandar Imam BC players
Sportspeople from Mashhad
Shooting guards
2014 FIBA Basketball World Cup players
Islamic Solidarity Games competitors for Iran